V/Line is a statutory authority that operates regional passenger train and coach services in Victoria, Australia. It provides passenger train services on five commuter lines and eight long-distance routes from its major hub at Southern Cross railway station in Melbourne. It also provides bus services across Victoria and into New South Wales, the Australian Capital Territory and South Australia. In addition, V/Line is responsible for the maintenance of much of the Victorian freight and passenger rail network outside of the areas managed by Metro Trains Melbourne and the Australian Rail Track Corporation.

The V/Line brand was introduced after the split-up of VicRail in 1983, and has been used by all successive government and private operators of the state's regional public transport. Until 1999, when its freight operations were privatised, V/Line Freight was also a monopoly government provider of the state's rail freight services. From 2004 the main operating rail company V/Line Pty Ltd was owned by the V/Line Corporation, a Victorian state government statutory corporation. In 2016, V/Line Corporation became a subsidiary agency of Public Transport Victoria and in July 2021 V/Line transitioned from a government-owned corporation to a statutory authority.

In the 2018–19 financial year, V/Line carried 22.4 million passengers, mostly on its commuter rail lines, which have experienced considerable patronage growth since 2005 due to improved services and population increases. V/Line's operations, particularly those on long-distance routes, remain heavily subsidised by the Victorian Government.

History

As a government authority
On 1 July 1983, the State Transport Authority and a range of other transport bodies were created, when the Transport Act 1983 came into effect. The new authority replaced VicRail, and established the V/Line operating brand for both country passenger and freight. The VicRail orange and silver "teacup' livery used on passenger rolling stock was replaced in August 1983 by an orange and grey livery. The white and green V/Line logo was launched on Sunday 21 August 1983 by the transport minister, Steve Crabb, at Spencer Street station, with special trains running to Essendon to mark the occasion. This was altered when on 1 July 1989 the Transport (Amendment) Act took effect, merging the State Transport Authority with the Metropolitan Transit Authority to form the Public Transport Corporation (PTC). The relationship between the country V/Line and suburban "The Met" brands was blurred, with the Sprinter trains delivered in the 1993-1995 period appearing in PTC colours but with both PTC and V/Line logos.

On 30 April 1984, the first V/Line country coach service commenced with a daily Melbourne to Mildura service being introduced, replacing services formerly operated by Ansett Pioneer and Holidaymakers of Mildura. It was operated under contract by Holidaymakers and Mildura Bus Lines. On 2 December 1984, the Speedlink service was introduced. This involved a road coach operating from Adelaide via Albury where it connected with the State Rail Authority's Riverina XPT to Sydney.

Other new coach services introduced were Warrnambool to Mount Gambier on 19 November 1984, Lang Lang to Inverloch on 9 December 1984, Warrnambool to Ballarat on 3 June 1985, Albury to Mildura and Dandenong to Cowes both on 2 September 1985, and Cobram to Shepparton and Melbourne to Shepparton both on 27 October 1985.

On 27 April 1987, the Canberra Link service commenced. A Mylon Motorways coach for Canberra connected with a train service from Melbourne at Wodonga. On the same date a service commenced from Mildura to Broken Hill, connecting off The Sunraysia.

On 1 July 1994, the operation of some of V/Line's regional passenger services was contracted out to the private sector. Hoys Roadlines took over the Melbourne to Cobram service with trains operated under contract by V/Line to Shepparton with Hoys operating a road coach service beyond. The service from Melbourne to Warrnambool was operated by West Coast Railway who operated their own trains throughout. Both of these returned to being operated by V/Line in 2004.

Rail services to Leongatha ceased on 24 July 1993, Bairnsdale, Cobram and Dimboola on 21 August 1993, Ararat on 27 May 1994 and Mildura on 13 September 1994.

In 1995, the freight and passenger rail divisions of V/Line were divided, with a new red, blue and white V/Line Passenger livery unveiled. This split was finalised on 1 July 1997 when separate management was brought in. On 1 July 1998, operation of the Stony Point line passed to Bayside Trains. V/Line continues to hire rolling stock to Metro Trains Melbourne to operate the service.

Privatisation

Freight Victoria

V/Line Freight was sold to a consortium of RailAmerica, Fluor Daniel, Macquarie Bank and A Goninan & Co and rebranded as Freight Victoria effective from 1 May 1999. The sale included a 45-year lease of most regional track (passenger and freight), with responsibilities for track, signalling and level crossings, with access to passenger sections of track granted to V/Line Passenger. The state government had not wanted to sell rights to the track infrastructure, but was persuaded by bids by three primarily American consortia which argued greater efficiencies could be accomplished by vertical integration.

After being renamed Freight Australia in March 2000, it was sold to Pacific National in August 2004. In May 2007 Pacific National sold the rail lease of the network back to VicTrack.

National Express
On 29 August 1999, National Express took control of V/Line Passenger, having won a 10-year concession in competition with FirstGroup, Freight Victoria, GB Railways, Prism Rail and Stagecoach. National Express also operated the M>Tram and M>Train franchises in Melbourne. It included all country rail operations in Victoria, with the exception of the Shepparton and Warrnambool services previously franchised in 1993.

National Express inherited a fleet of A, N, P and Y class locomotives, H, N, S and Z type carriages and Sprinter diesel multiple units. As a franchise commitment, 29 two-car VLocitys were ordered from Bombardier.

In December 2002, National Express handed in its Victorian rail and tram franchises having been unable to renegotiate financial terms with the State Government. KPMG were appointed to operate the business on behalf of the State Government.

As a statutory corporation

Full control of V/Line was taken on 1 October 2003 by changing the shareholding of V/Line, making the government the sole shareholder via a recently created statutory corporation, V/Line Passenger Corporation. V/Line operates under a franchise agreement entered into with the Director of Public Transport. The Director also sub leases tracks and other infrastructure which the Director holds under lease from VicTrack, the agency which owns Victoria's rail-related land and infrastructure.

In 2000, the Regional Fast Rail project was launched to upgrade the tracks linking Ballarat, Bendigo, Geelong and the Latrobe Valley to Melbourne. The project, which also included an extra 10 Vlocitys and an expanded timetable of rail services, commenced full operations from December 2005.

The services to Bairnsdale and Ararat were restored in May and July 2004 respectively. In December 2008, as part of the Victorian Transport Plan, the state government announced that V/Line rail passenger services would be extended from Ballarat to Maryborough at a cost of $50 million, commencing in July 2010. The first passenger train in 15 years arrived at Maryborough on 24 July 2010. V/Line also resumed operating the Shepparton and Warrnambool services in 2004 when contacts with Hoys Roadliners and West Coast Railway expired.

In November 2006 Pacific National, which had purchased Freight Australia, entered into an agreement to sell the remainder of its Victorian rail lease of the network back to VicTrack. The sale was completed on 7 May 2007, with V/Line becoming the track manager of the Victorian intrastate network.

In May 2008 it was announced that part of the V/Line fleet would be converted to standard gauge to operate an upgraded Albury line service. In December 2008 V/Line ended the sale of alcoholic beverages aboard long-distance trains, after almost a century of the practice.

In 2015/16, the subsidy per passenger trip was $22.12.

The Transport Integration Act 2010 renamed the V/Line Passenger Corporation as V/Line Corporation. The Act also gave V/Line a new statutory charter. As part of these changes, the corporation's responsibilities were explicitly expanded to cover both rail passenger and rail freight services. The Act received the Royal assent on 2 March 2010 and came into effect on 1 July 2010.

In January 2016, V/Line's VLocity rolling stock was identified as suffering from abnormal wheel wear. The fleet was also banned from the metropolitan track lease by the suburban rail operator, Metro Trains Melbourne, after a V/Line train failed to activate a level crossing in Dandenong. The two problems caused as many as 70 services a day to be cancelled. They also led to the resignation of then CEO Theo Taifalos, 16 days free travel being provided to passengers, and an independent inquiry being ordered by the public transport minister, Jacinta Allan, into the operational capacity of V/Line. It was later identified that the wheel wear was caused by harsh curves in track segments, particularly along the Regional Rail Link route, which was opened 7 months prior in June 2015 as a means of separating V/Line and Metro trains en route to the CBD. In particular, the worst of these track curves was identified as being along the Dynon-North Melbourne flyover, which passes just above North Melbourne station and was rebuilt as part of the project as a means of separating the V/Line and Metro train paths into Southern Cross station. As a result, the flyover track segment was replaced, and permanent 30 km/h speed restrictions were introduced from the flyover to South Kensington.

On 1 July 2021, V/Line transitioned from a state-owned corporation to a statutory authority.

Services

V/Line operates rail services to the regional cities of Ballarat, Bendigo, Geelong, Seymour and Traralgon as well as Ararat, Maryborough, Echuca, Swan Hill, Albury, Bairnsdale, Warrnambool and Shepparton. In addition, V/Line road coaches connect with many rail services at major stations to serve towns away from the main rail network operating as far as Adelaide and Canberra.

Rail services are grouped into two types. As part of the introduction of the Myki smartcard in 2013, and to provide consistent communication to both staff and customers, what were formerly called "interurban" services became "commuter" services, and what were formerly called "intercity" services became "long distance" services. 

Commuter services operate over shorter distances and more frequently than long-distance services, and the latter usually provide some first-class seating, as well as snack bar facilities. Long-distance services do not use the Myki ticketing system, as they use reserved paper tickets instead. 

Commuter services include the Ballarat, Bendigo, Geelong, Gippsland and Seymour Lines. Long-distance services extend beyond to Albury, Ararat, Bairnsdale, Echuca, Maryborough, Shepparton, Swan Hill and Warrnambool.

All rail services depart from Southern Cross station in Melbourne on the following lines with the exception of one Traralgon service which departs/ terminates at Flinders Street.
South West Region or Geelong Line which continues as the Warrnambool Line
Western Region or Ballarat Line which continues as the Ararat Line and the Maryborough Line
Northern Region or Bendigo Line which extends as the Swan Hill Line and the Echuca Line
North East Region or Seymour Line which extends as the Shepparton Line and the Albury Line
Eastern Region or Bairnsdale Line

V/Line also runs numerous intrastate and interstate road coach services that may run wholly as a coach service or operate as a coach connecting with a rail service.

Interstate road coach service operated by V/Line are:
Canberra Link - Melbourne (Southern Cross) - Canberra via Wodonga, runs as a train to Albury and then a coach to Canberra
Capital Link - Melbourne (Southern Cross) - Canberra via Bairnsdale, runs as a train to Bairnsdale and then a coach to Canberra
Daylink - Melbourne (Southern Cross) - Adelaide via Bendigo, runs as a train to Bendigo and then a coach to Adelaide 6 days a week and as a coach the whole way on Sunday.
Sapphire Coast Link - Melbourne (Southern Cross) - Batemans Bay via Bairnsdale, runs as a train to Bairnsdale and then a coach to Batemans Bay
Speedlink - Sydney - Adelaide via Albury.  This operates as the NSW TrainLink XPT train from Sydney to Albury with a V/Line coach operating from Albury to Adelaide.
Murraylink - Mildura - Albury, does not travel to Melbourne and operates entirely as a coach.

Ticketing

V/Line currently uses the myki ticketing system on its commuter train services, in addition to machine printed paper tickets, issued from staffed V/Line stations, selected Metro suburban premium stations, V/Line ticket agents, online or by phone. Passengers boarding services at unmanned stations or roadside coach stops can purchase tickets from the train conductor or coach driver.

Tickets have the origin and destination printed upon them, making them point to point, but the fare itself is based on charging zones. Changes were made to the fare system, to integrate it with the suburban Metcard system in preparation for the introduction of the Myki smartcard system to cover the entire state.

Ticket types available include single, return and a range of periodical tickets. Services are classified as peak and off-peak, with discounts available for tickets valid in off-peak times only. V/Line operates a limited number of trains with first class seating which requires the payment of an upgrade fee on top of the standard economy fare. From June 2013 the Myki smartcard system began to be rolled out on the V/Line network. As of January 2023, Myki ticketing is only used between Melbourne and the following stations: Geelong, Ballarat, Bendigo, Epsom, Eaglehawk, Traralgon and Seymour. Further out, paper tickets are still required. 

Most V/Line services operate on a non-allocated seating basis, but all intercity (long-distance) rail services, and some coach services, require seat reservations.

2023 fare cap 
During the 2022 state election, the Victorian government promised to cap all V/Line fares to $9.20 for daily travel and $4.60 for concession card holders, regardless of distance travelled. This would make V/Line fares cost the same as a daily fare for travel with Metropolitan Melbourne, and represented the largest cut in fares in the system's history. A daily peak fare from Bendigo would be cut from $68.80 to $9.20, while Ballarat would be cut from $45.60 and Geelong from $27.60. An overnight trip to Swan Hill would be cut from a total cost of $92 to $18.40, as it requires two daily fares.

In early 2023, the state government announced the changes would take effect on 31st of March 2023. Concerns were raised by public transport advocates that the system would struggle to cope with the expected increase in patronage from the fare cap, particularly during off-peak times and weekends. During the election the government promised an extra 23 new VLocity trains and an increase in weekend V/Line frequencies, but these were not expected until 2024.

Rolling stock

Railcars

Locomotives

Carriage stock and vans

Former stock

Road coaches

Road coaches are provided by 23 private companies including BusBiz, Dineen Group, Donric Group, Dysons, Firefly Express, Mee's Bus Lines, Panorama Coaches and Ventura Bus Lines, which are contracted by Public Transport Victoria to operate services for V/Line. These coaches are painted in V/Line livery.

Network access
V/Line also manages and maintains all non-interstate rural rail track in Victoria, including lines that do not see passenger services. The lease was previously held by Pacific National, which agreed to sell it back to the Victorian Government in November 2006. The sale was completed in May 2007, and V/Line was appointed to manage it.

Branding

The initial V/Line visual identity was unveiled in August 1983, with an orange and grey livery for locomotives and passenger rolling stock, along with a white and green V/Line logo with a "stylised capital lettered logo with the V and the L split by a deep slashing stroke". Work on the initial V/Line identity started in May 1983, with freight wagons being released without logos pending the launch. Before that time, a stylised VR logo was carried by rolling stock that had been received the orange and silver VicRail "teacup" livery since 1981. Carriages in the 'teacup' livery later had the logos removed and replaced by V/Line ones.

This remained until 1993 when the Sprinter trains were delivered in the teal and yellow suburban 'The Met' brand colours, but with both The Met and V/Line logos. In 1995, the freight and passenger rail divisions of V/Line were divided, with locomotives in the freight fleet retaining the orange and grey livery with 'V/Line Freight' logos, while passenger carriages and locomotive received the red blue and white 'V/Line Passenger' livery which remains on some of the fleet today. It was also at that time that the V/Line logo was altered, with serifs added to the lettering, and the "deep slashing stroke" was altered to a curved blue line. After National Express took over V/Line, the logo was again altered in 2000, with mixed-case lettering and a curving blue line underneath. In 2006, it was again altered, with the removal of the blue line underneath and addition of a purple line.

The VLocity railcars were delivered from 2005 in a new livery of stainless steel with purple and green highlights. In 2007, a new livery was unveiled, consisting of a grey carbody with red, white and purple stripes. Rolling stock in different variants of the livery was released throughout that year, with a consistent version not appearing until 2008, along with a number of repainted locomotives.

In 2013, a Public Transport Victoria (PTV) livery of purple and white diamonds was adopted, and was progressively applied to V/Locitys and road coaches. This livery matches the geometric designs seen on other PTV services, and uses purple in keeping with the designation of regional services with purple branding. In early 2017, locomotive N457 was re-painted with a version of the PTV livery, and Set SN 8 was re-painted to match the new livery of the V/Locity fleet. Most of the Fleet have now received this Purple Livery, Except for a few N Class Locomotives, Which still have the Mk3 'Cheeseburger' Livery.

Sponsorships
Since 2004, V/Line has been the naming rights sponsor of the Australian Football League's Victorian country competition for junior players. The V/Line Cup is played over several days in September and includes two boys' divisions and one girls' division.

Publication
V/Line published an in-house magazine. It replaced VicRail News, initially being published as STA News then V/Line News from December 1983 until February 1991.

References

External links

PTV Website
Department of Transport Victoria
Metro Trains Melbourne
V/Line
V/LineCars.com - Comprehensive V/Line Carriages Information & Enthusiast website
VikTrack website
Vicsig.net - Victorian passenger rolling stock
 - Link Logistics International Pvt Ltd
 – Agency record at Public Records Office Victoria

Government-owned companies of Victoria (Australia)
National Express companies
Passenger railway companies of Australia
Rail transport in Victoria (Australia)
Railway companies established in 1983
1983 establishments in Australia